is the incumbent chairman of Japan Tobacco, a Nikkei 225 company.

In 1976, Kimura started working for the Japan Tobacco & Salt Public Corporation (current name 'Japan Tobacco'). He became the president for this company on June 23, 2006. Mitsuomi Koizumi became the president of this company in June 2012, and became chairman.

References 

1954 births
Living people
Japanese businesspeople
Japan Tobacco